Donna Farhi (born 5 June 1959) is a teacher of yoga as exercise and the author of five books on practising and teaching yoga. She has been described as a yoga "superstar".

Life

Farhi has been teaching yoga since 1982. She lives in Christchurch, New Zealand where she keeps horses and practises dressage as well as yoga. She tours the world each year to teach yoga in different countries. As well as yoga, she has been influenced by her friend the psychologist Richard Miller, founder of the Integrative Restoration Institute, and teaches the restorative technique of yoga nidra. She studied the asanas with B. K. S. Iyengar in India, finding the practice formal and leading to constant injuries, and then with Angela Farmer to investigate a freer style of practice.

Farhi has written articles for Yoga International and Yoga Journal. She has been described as a yoga "superstar", and has been profiled in at least four publications as an exceptional yoga teacher, including in Janice Gates's 2006 Yogini: The Power of Women in Yoga.

Elle magazine recorded that Farhi had experienced abuse from a yoga teacher when she was "in her late twenties", leading her to contribute to the Yoga Alliance's guidelines for teacher-pupil relationships.

Gates writes that Farhi is saddened by the "very strong, explicit identification with the body" in modern yoga as exercise, a focus that in Farhi's view is diametrically opposed to yoga's traditional philosophy that the focus should instead be on the force (prana) that animates the body. Her teaching "integrates breathing, movement, and inner inquiry".

The yoga teacher and author Cyndi Lee described Farhi as a "renowned yoga teacher and author".

Books

 1996: The Breathing Book. Holt, 
 2000: Yoga Mind, Body and Spirit. Holt, 
 2005: Bringing Yoga to Life. HarperCollins, 
 2006: Teaching Yoga. Rodmell, 
 2017: Pathways to a Centered Body. Embodied Wisdom,  (with Leila Stuart)

See also

 Yoga for women

References

Sources

External links

 

1959 births
Yoga teachers
Living people